The 1978 Bossier City tornado outbreak was an outbreak of 11 tornadoes that occurred during the early morning hours of December 3, 1978, in Louisiana and Arkansas. The outbreak produced several significant (F2–F5) tornadoes, several of which were long tracked. The first and most destructive of the tornadoes was a violent F4 tornado touched down on the eastern bank of the Red River in Bossier City, Louisiana, at approximately 1:50 a.m. CST. The only two deaths to occur in Bossier City were two young girls who were killed when a car was thrown through their bedroom wall. The Bossier City tornado became the fifth tornado in American history to produce at least $100 million (non-adjusted) in damage.

Meteorological synopsis 
On Monday, November 27, 1978, a cold front moved through Northwest Louisiana. By Friday, December 1, a positively tilted trough was present in the upper atmosphere from the High Plains to the Desert Southwest. This allowed Gulf moisture to return to the lower part of the atmosphere Friday night. The placement of the upper atmospheric trough allowed very little movement of the associated front from Thursday to Saturday. At this time, the front stretched over north Texas, Southern Missouri, Southwestern Arkansas, and Southeast Oklahoma. This front was unusually strong for the month of December, and placed the Shreveport area under the right exit region of a strong jet stream. The strong synoptic-scale lifting was favorable to thunderstorm formation. Also at this time, a low pressure system had developed over Northeast Texas. This caused increased low-level wind shear that enabled the development of thunderstorms. Meanwhile, a warm temperature plume, or inversion, at the 850-millibar geopotential height allowed low-level instability to increase. CAPE thus soared to 2,179 j/kg on December 2, the evening before the outbreak began.

Confirmed tornadoes

December 3 event

Shreveport/Bossier City, Louisiana 

In Deep East Texas, a series of supercell thunderstorms developed ahead of a squall line. As thunderstorms approached the area, a Severe thunderstorm warning was issued at 1:27 a.m. CST for northern Caddo and Bossier Parishes. The supercell which spawned the tornado tracked over the town of Deadwood, Texas, before moving over Southwood High School, Pierremont Mall, and the VA Hospital in Shreveport with no reports of tornadic activity. Due to radar indication of possible rotation, the NWS issued a tornado warning at 1:33 a.m. CST. At 1:50 a.m. the tornado may have touched down just south of downtown Shreveport, causing damage, though post-storm analysis suggested that this was likely related to downburst activity. The circulation then crossed into the Central Park subdivision in western central Bossier City and made full contact with the ground. The tornado caused minor damage in the Central Park neighborhood which amounted to some roof damage and fallen trees. The tornado's track across Old Minden Road brought it through the SWEPCO power substation, creating a tangle of power lines and connectors.

The tornado then crossed Interstate 20 and then Barksdale Boulevard, making its way into the Heart of Bossier Shopping Center and causing extensive damage. As it touched down near the Heart of Bossier Shopping Center, it destroyed Christmas decorations, street lights, and sign posts. Baskin-Robbins and Pancho's were among the businesses in the Heart of Bossier Shopping Center which sustained major damage. It continued northeast across Old Minden Road striking a power substation, the Port-au-Prince apartments, the Sheraton Hotel, several houses in the adjacent Central Plaza subdivision and Rusheon Junior High School. Two buildings at the Port-au-Prince Apartments lost their roofs and cars throughout the parking lot were piled on top of each other. The Sheraton hotel and Rusheon Junior High School also sustained roof damage and broken windows. As the tornado traveled along Interstate 20, several 18-wheelers were toppled by the winds. It continued parallel to Interstate 20 into the Airline Drive Business District, where it produced widespread F3 damage. In this area, numerous businesses were damaged or completely leveled, including Pizza Hut, the Best Western, the Master Hosts Inn, Whataburger, Thrifty Liquor and K-Mart. A small area surrounding the Whataburger received high-end F3 to marginal F4 winds. One noted anomaly was the minor damage caused to the Whataburger. It was later speculated that the position of the Whataburger situated between two suction vortices.

The tornado made its way through K-Mart and the intersection of Airline Drive and U.S. Route 80 throwing several mobile homes out into the middle of U.S. Route 80. After crossing U.S Route 80, the tornado moved through a sparsely populated area and then into the Meadowview and Swan Lake submissions, destroying substantial parts of the neighborhood. Traveling into the Meadowview neighborhood, the tornado tore through several streets of housing. It was in this neighborhood that the only two deaths occurred from this tornado. On La Don Drive, Lisa and Jana Currington, ages 13 and 8, were killed when a car was thrown through the wall of the bedroom they were sleeping in. Aerial photography revealed a distinct swath of ground scouring in the Meadowview area. Meadowview Elementary School suffered extensive damage with one wing of the school being completely destroyed. Nearby, a National Guard armory was completely destroyed. As it crossed Interstate 220, the tornado leveled the Northwest Louisiana State School. As it passed through the Stockwell Place subdivision, the tornado again produced F4 damage to several homes. The storm continued to track northeastward until it dissipated over the Red Chute area.

Total damage from the tornado reached $100 million (1978 USD), making the tornado one of the top 30 costliest on record in the United States. Dr. Tetsuya T. Fujita surveyed the tornado damage and completed extensive surveys on the ground and from the air. He assigned the F4 rating after extensive investigation, though the F4 damage only occurred in small sections of the Meadowview, Swan Lake, and Stockwell Place subdivisions. In all, the tornado destroyed 75 homes and 51 businesses throughout a large part of Bossier City, and damaged hundreds of other buildings.

References 

 Bossier City Tornado (Out of Print), Westone Publishing

Bibliography

External links 
 Bossier Parish Tornadoes (1950 - 9/2004)
 http://www.srh.noaa.gov/shv/BossierTornado/

F4 tornadoes by date
Bossier City, Louisiana,1978-12-03
Tornadoes of 1978
Tornadoes in Louisiana
Tornadoes in Arkansas
1978 in Louisiana
Bossier City tornado outbreak